The eighth season of the reality television series Love & Hip Hop: Atlanta aired on VH1 from March 25, 2019, until July 29, 2019. The show was primarily filmed in Atlanta, Georgia. It is executively produced by Mona Scott-Young and Stephanie R. Gayle for Monami Entertainment, Toby Barraud, Stefan Springman, David DiGangi, Jamail Shelton, Brian Schornak and Richard Allen for Eastern TV, and Nina L. Diaz and Vivian Gomez for VH1.

The series chronicles the lives of several women and men in the Atlanta area, involved in hip hop music. It consists of 20 episodes, including a two-part reunion special hosted by Nina Parker.

Production
Season eight of Love & Hip Hop: Atlanta began filming in October 2018. Months earlier, on July 18, 2018, it was reported that Stevie J and Faith Evans had married in Las Vegas. On October 18, 2018, Tommie was arrested for allegedly attacking her daughter at her high school while heavily intoxicated. On January 3, 2019, while facing up to 54 years behind bars for the crime, Tommie confirmed that she would not be returning to the show. Erica Mena would also not return as a series regular, although she denied she had been fired and would later appear as a commentator for the special 40 Greatest Love & Hip Hop Moments: The Reboot, which would air during the season. 

On February 25, 2019, VH1 announced Love & Hip Hop: Atlanta would be returning for an eighth season on March 25, 2019. On March 4, 2019, VH1 released a promo confirming that Spice, Scrapp DeLeon and Yung Joc had been promoted to the main cast, after appearing in previous seasons as supporting cast members. T.I. & Tiny: The Family Hustles Shekinah Anderson, rapper Akbar V, socialite Pooh Hicks, Che Mack, Joc's fiancé Kendra Robinson and Love & Hip Hop: Hollywoods Moniece Slaughter would join the supporting cast, while Stevie J's new wife Faith Evans would make guest appearances. Bambi's mother Cece and salon owner Sharonda Official would also appear in minor supporting roles. On March 12, 2019, Stevie J tweeted "Not returning for a full season. No need". Subsequently, he appeared infrequently during the season, despite being credited as a cast member in every episode.

On March 6, 2019, VH1 began releasing a series of cast interviews with Rasheeda, Mimi, Karlie, Spice, Stevie J, Kirk and Tokyo Vanity. On March 16, 2019, VH1 released a sneak peek of the season's premiere episode. On March 18, 2019, VH1 released a 5-minute super trailer.

On April 1, 2019, VH1 aired Love & Hip Hop Awards: Most Certified, a special hosted by Tami Roman and DC Young Fly and featuring Love & Hip Hop franchise cast members being awarded in various categories. The show would feature appearances from current and former Atlanta cast members Mimi, Karlie, K. Michelle, Kirk, Momma Dee, Shay Johnson, Yung Joc and Moniece, as well as Love & Hip Hop: New Yorks Cardi B, Amina Buddafly, Tara Wallace, Mariahlynn, Yandy Smith, Remy Ma, Jonathan Fernandez and Mama Jones, Hollywoods Safaree Samuels, Ray J and A1 Bentley, and Miamis Bobby Lytes and Amara La Negra. On April 8, 2019, VH1 aired another clip show special, 40 Greatest Love & Hip Hop Moments: The Reboot, which would again feature appearances from the aforementioned cast members, as well as Erica Mena, Love & Hip Hop: Hollywoods Paris Phillips and Misster Ray, and Miamis Trina.

Cast

Starring

 Rasheeda (18 episodes)
 Mimi Faust (16 episodes)
 Karlie Redd (18 episodes)
 Spice (12 episodes)
 Scrapp DeLeon (15 episodes)
 Yung Joc (17 episodes)
 Stevie J (8 episodes)

Also starring

 Tokyo Vanity (15 episodes)
 Momma Dee (11 episodes)
 Karen King (8 episodes)
 Sierra Gates (16 episodes)
 Kirk Frost (15 episodes)
 Pooh Hicks (13 episodes)
 Tiarra Becca (4 episodes)
 Che Mack (11 episodes)
 Lil Scrappy (15 episodes)
 Moniece Slaughter (6 episodes)
 Bambi Benson (12 episodes)
 Shekinah Anderson (18 episodes)
 Akbar V (14 episodes)
 Cee Cee (3 episodes)
 Jasmine Washington (2 episodes)
 Kendra Robinson (14 episodes)
 Erica Dixon (9 episodes)
 BK Brasco (6 episodes) 
 Kelsie Frost (4 episodes) 
 Sharonda Official (3 episodes) 
 Sina Bina (3 episodes) 

Tommie Lee returns briefly in unseen archival footage in the season premiere. Faith Evans, Eva Jordan, Sas, Arkansas Mo, Made Man, Mingnon Dixon, Hiriam Hicks, Ty Young and Shirleen Harvell appear as guest stars in several episodes. The show features minor appearances from notable figures within the hip hop industry and Atlanta's social scene, including Kandi Burruss, Pastor Jamal Bryant, Machel Montano, Destra Garcia and Dr. Jeff.

Episodes

Webisodes

Check Yourself
Love & Hip Hop Atlanta: Check Yourself, which features the cast's reactions to each episode, was released weekly with every episode on digital platforms.

Bonus scenes
Deleted scenes from the season's episodes were released weekly as bonus content on VH1's official website.

Music
Several cast members had their music featured on the show and released singles to coincide with the airing of the episodes.

References

External links

2019 American television seasons
Love & Hip Hop